Skalariak is a Spanish ska band founded in 1994 in Navarre by Juantxo Skalari and Peio Skalari. Their lyrics are in Spanish and Basque. Also in their works the sounds of punk, reggae, and other styles can be found.

Members

Current members
 Juantxo Skalari: vocals
 Javier Etxeberria: guitar
 Luisillo Kalandraka: bass
 Mario Memola: saxophone
 Enrique Rubiños: drums
 Guillermo: trombone
 Rubén Antón: trumpet
 Olatz Andueza: keyboard + accordion

Former Members
 Zara (Cristina Zariategi): bass
 Naiara Krutxaga: keyboard
 Marco Bellizzi: trombone
 David Orduña: trumpet
 Peio Skalari: drums
 Hiart Leitza: keyboard

Discography

Albums
 Skalariak (Gor, 1997) CD.
 Namaluj Certa Na Zed (Gor, 1998) CD.
 Klub Ska (Gor, 1999) CD.
 En la kalle (Gor, 2001)  CD.
 Radio Ghetto (Boa Music, 2003)  CD.
 Luz rebelde (Boa Music, 2005)  CD.
 Ska Republik Concert (Maldito Records, 2008) 2CD + DVD.

Singles
 O neure herri (Gor, 1997). CD-single.
 Sólo vivir (Gor, 1998). CD-single.
 Skalari Rude Klub (Gor, 2001). CD-single.
 Vodka Revolution (Gor, 2001). CD-single.
 Baietz Oraingoan! (2006). Single.

Videos
 Skalariak: Street's Ska (Gor, 2003). DVD.

Compilation Contributions
 "Txapeldunak" in Latin Ska Vol. II (Moon Ska, 1996). CD.
 "O neure herri" in Skankin' the Scum Away (Mad Butcher, 1998). CD. German compilation of European ska bands.
 "Sólo vivir" in UniverSonoro Vol. 5 (BOA, 1999). CD.
 "Uníos" in Wir Haben Eine Weltz Zu Gewinnen (Mad Butcher, 2000). CD. German  compilation of  European ska bands.
 Latin Ska Jazz (Sock It, 2000). CD.
 "Arazoak arazo" in Nafarroa Hitza Dantzan (Nafarroako Bertsozale Elkartea/Gor, 2001). CD in which Navarrese groups interpret poems of different Navarrese bertsolaris.
 Dance Ska La. 2001 (Banana Juice, 2001). CD.

External links 
 

Spanish ska groups
Rock en Español music groups
Basque music bands